Anne Grethe Jensen (born November 7, 1951) is a Danish equestrian. She won a silver medal in individual dressage at the 1984 Summer Olympics in Los Angeles. She is also one-time World Champion and one-time European Champion in individual dressage.

References

1951 births
Living people
Danish female equestrians
Olympic equestrians of Denmark
Olympic silver medalists for Denmark
Olympic medalists in equestrian
Equestrians at the 1984 Summer Olympics
Equestrians at the 1988 Summer Olympics
Equestrians at the 1992 Summer Olympics
Medalists at the 1984 Summer Olympics
Danish dressage riders